Xue Ming (born 23 February 1987 in Beijing) is a female Chinese volleyball player. She was part of the gold medal winning team at the 2005 Asian Championship.

Awards

Individuals
 2009 Montreux Volley Masters "Best Spiker"

References

External links
 Profile

1987 births
Living people
Chinese women's volleyball players
Olympic bronze medalists for China
Olympic volleyball players of China
Volleyball players from Beijing
Volleyball players at the 2008 Summer Olympics
Olympic medalists in volleyball
Medalists at the 2008 Summer Olympics
Asian Games medalists in volleyball
Volleyball players at the 2010 Asian Games
Asian Games gold medalists for China
Medalists at the 2010 Asian Games
Middle blockers
21st-century Chinese women